M is an album by guitarist John Abercrombie's Quartet recorded in 1980 and released by ECM in 1981.

Reception
The Allmusic review by Jim Todd gave the album 2½ stars, stating, "If only all of this set were as brilliantly melodic and driving as its best three tracks."

Track listing

Personnel
 John Abercrombie – electric guitar, acoustic guitar
 Richie Beirach – piano
 George Mraz – double bass
 Peter Donald – drums

References

ECM Records albums
John Abercrombie (guitarist) albums
1981 albums
Albums produced by Manfred Eicher